The Institut für Rundfunktechnik GmbH (IRT) (Institute for Broadcasting Technology Ltd.) was a research centre of German broadcasters (ARD / ZDF / DLR), Austria's broadcaster (ORF) and the Swiss public broadcaster (SRG / SSR). It was responsible for research on broadcasting technology. It was founded in 1956 and was located in Munich, Germany.

They invented or were influential in the research, development and field-testing of important standards such as ARI, RDS, VPS, DSR, DAB and DVB-T.

Institut für Rundfunktechnik was a founding member of the Hybrid Broadcast Broadband TV (HbbTV) consortium of broadcasting and Internet industry companies that established an open European standard (called HbbTV) for hybrid set-top boxes for the reception of broadcast TV and broadband multimedia applications with a single user interface.

In 2020, ZDF and then other supporters indicated that they planned to withdraw from the organization, so the IRT was closed by the end of 2020.

Former members
 Bayerischer Rundfunk
 Deutsche Welle
 Deutschlandradio
 Hessischer Rundfunk
 Mitteldeutscher Rundfunk
 Norddeutscher Rundfunk
 Österreichischer Rundfunk
 Radio Bremen
 Rundfunk Berlin-Brandenburg
 Saarländischer Rundfunk
 SRG SSR
 Südwestrundfunk
 Westdeutscher Rundfunk Köln
 ZDF

See also
 High Com FM (researched and field-trialed by IRT between 1979 and 1984)
 Wittmoor List (maintained by IRT up to June 2018)
 European Broadcasting Union (EBU)
 International Telecommunication Union (ITU)
 DVB Project
 WorldDAB
 Public broadcasting
 Teletext
  (FTZ)
  (RFZ)
  (IVZ)

References

Further reading

External links
 
 https://web.archive.org/web/20210430071454/https://www.irt.de/en/home
 https://web.archive.org/web/20210430023055/https://www.irt.de/de/publikationen/technische-richtlinien/technische-richtlinien-archiv Technical guidelines

ARD (broadcaster)
International research institutes
Information technology research institutes
1956 establishments in West Germany
2020 disestablishments in Germany
Radio technology
Research institutes in Munich
Scientific organizations established in 1956
Television technology
ZDF